Damanhur (Egyptian: Dmỉ-n-Ḥr.w;  ;) is a city in Lower Egypt, and the capital of the Beheira Governorate.

Etymology

Damanhur was known in the ancient Egyptian language as The City of (the god) Horus, on the grounds that it was a center for the worship of this god. It was also known by other names: in the Egyptian texts, "Behdet"; in the Greek texts "Hermou Polis Mikra" (the lesser city of Hermes), translated to Latin by the Romans as "Hermopolis Parva"; the name "Obollenoboles" (or Apollonopolis) associated it with the Greek god Apollo, and it was also called "Tel Ballamon". Now it is known by its oldest name, which was rendered in Bohairic , and thus rendered in Arabic as "Damanhur" following the Islamic conquest.

History 
In ancient Egypt, the city was the capital of Lower Egypt's 7th Nome of A-ment. It stood on the banks of a canal which connected the lake Mareotis with the Canopic or most westerly arm of the Nile. The city was dedicated to the Ancient Egyptian god Horus. In Greek and Roman times, it was called Hermopolis Mikra or Hermopolis Parva, which would also give it an association with Hermes, the Egyptian Thoth. As Hermopolis, the city attracted the notice of numerous ancient geographers, including Stephanus of Byzantium s. v., Strabo (xvii. p. 802), Ptolemy (iv. 5. § 46), and the author of the Antonine Itinerary (p. 154). It is a Roman Catholic titular see.

It was first made a provincial capital under Fatimid rule in 11th century, and in the Middle Ages it prospered as a caravan town on the post road from Cairo to Alexandria. It was severely damaged in 1302 by an earthquake, but in the late 14th century the Mamluk caliph Barquq restored its fortifications to protect the city from Bedouins.

In 1799, the city revolted against the French, who cruelly crushed the rebels, killing 1,500.

In 1986, the population of Damanhur was 188,939. The richly cultivated Beheira province gives rise to mainly agricultural industries which include cotton ginning, potato processing, and date picking. It also has a market for cotton and rice.

on the 10th of February 2023 Six people, including three boys, were killed and at least 20 injured when an apartment building collapsed on Friday in the Nile Delta city of Damanhur.

Notable people 

 Cyril VI
 Ahmed H. Zewail

Climate

Being located close to the Nile Delta and the northern coast of Egypt, that give Damanhur a hot desert climate (Köppen: BWh), moderated by blowing winds coming from the Mediterranean Sea, typical to the coast. The city gets average precipitation during winter, and rare rain during other seasons. Hail and frost are not unknown specifically during winter.

References

External links
 
https://www.facebook.com/Egy.Dam Official Facebook page for the city 
https://web.archive.org/web/20051107230115/http://www.damanhour.5u.com/en.htm English script
https://web.archive.org/web/20080321235728/http://www.saeednet.4t.com/ live cam from damanhour

Populated places in Beheira Governorate
Hermopolis Parva
Jewish pilgrimage sites
Medieval cities of Egypt
Metropolitan areas of Egypt
Governorate capitals in Egypt